Sharptown may refer to:

Sharptown, Indiana
Sharptown, Maryland